Lala or La La is a feminine nickname, in Spanish naming conventions it is often a hypocorism for Esmeralda. It also translates as elder brother in Pashto. It may refer to:

 Shahid Afridi (born 1977), Pakistani cricketer
 Lala Amarnath (1911–2000), Indian cricketer
 La La Anthony (born 1979), American radio and television personality, author, businesswoman and actress
 Lalawélé Atakora (born 1990), Togolese footballer
 Dolores "LaLa" Brooks (born 1947), former member of the girl group the Crystals
 Raymond Lalonde (born 1940), American politician, retired educator
 Lauren Laverne (born 1978), British TV and radio presenter
 Lala Sjöqvist (1903–1964), Swedish diver, 1928 Olympic bronze medalist
 La Forrest 'La La' Cope, American R&B singer/songwriter, composer of "You Give Good Love"
 Varto Terian (1896–1974) Iranian actress, used LaLa as a pseudonym for stage acting.

See also 

Lists of people by nickname
Spanish-language hypocorisms